The Southwest University of Science and Technology (SWUST) is a provincial public university in Mianyang, Sichuan. There are 17 schools in the university. The campus has over 29,000 students: graduate and undergraduate. As of 2015, Xiao Zhengxue (肖正学) is the president.

It covers an area of 4088 mu. It is the second largest university in Sichuan province. The motto of Southwest University of Science and Technology is to be moral, to be learned, to be practical, and to be innovative.

History
The university originated with the 1939 founding of the Sichuan Jiangjin Ceramics Vocational and Technical School and the Sichuan Provincial Advanced Agricultural Vocational School, which occurred during the Sino-Japanese War. The campus was originally the Mianyang branch of Tsinghua University.

Department
There are 17 departments, colleges, and schools:
 College of Adult Education
 College of Network Education
 Department of Physical Education
 School of Applied Technology
 School of Chinese Literature and Arts
 School of Civil Engineering and Architecture
 School of Computer Science and Technology
 School of Economy and Management
 School of Environmental Resources and Engineering
 School of Foreign Languages and Cultures
 School of Information Engineering
 School of Law
 School of Life Science and Engineering
 School of Manufacturing Science and Engineering
 School of Material Science and Engineering
 School National Defense Science and Technology
 School of Science

See also
Lin Xiangdi, former president of Southwest University of Science and Technology

References

External links

 Southwest University of Science and Technology
 Southwest University of Science and Technology 

Universities and colleges in Sichuan